Hochdahl-Millrath station is a through station in the district of Millrath of the town of Erkrath in the German state of North Rhine-Westphalia. The station was opened in 1968 or 1969 on the section of the Düsseldorf–Elberfeld railway from Erkrath to Wuppertal-Vohwinkel that was opened by the Düsseldorf-Elberfeld Railway Company on 10 April 1841. It has two platform tracks and it is classified by Deutsche Bahn as a category 5 station.

The station is served by Rhine-Ruhr S-Bahn lines S 8 between Mönchengladbach and Wuppertal-Oberbarmen or Hagen every 20 minutes and several S 68 services between Wuppertal-Vohwinkel and Langenfeld in the peak hour.

It is also served by two bus routes operated by Rheinbahn: O5 (every 20 minutes) and O6 (20-60).

References

Rhine-Ruhr S-Bahn stations
S8 (Rhine-Ruhr S-Bahn)
Railway stations in Germany opened in 1968
Buildings and structures in Mettmann (district)